The men's 10,000 metres event at the 2007 Pan American Games was held on July 27.

Results

References
Official results

10000
2007